"Ricky" is a 1983 song by "Weird Al" Yankovic, duetting with voice actress Tress MacNeille. It is a parody of the 1982 song "Mickey" by Toni Basil, which itself, is a cover of Mike Chapman and Nicky Chinn's "Kitty" recorded by Racey. The song focuses on the sitcom I Love Lucy, and ends with a segment of the theme from the sitcom.

A music video was created for the song; it was Yankovic's first. According to the liner notes in the compilation DVD "Weird Al" Yankovic: The Ultimate Video Collection, "it was arguably the first comedy video ever shown on MTV".

Track listing
"Ricky" – 2:35
"Buckingham Blues" – 3:11

Music video
The music video was directed by Janet Greek. It was filmed mostly in black and white and parodies the television sitcom I Love Lucy. Yankovic plays the role of Ricky Ricardo, complete with affected Cuban accent. Yankovic appears, minus his mustache, glasses, and curly hair, to more closely resemble Desi Arnaz. He is also seen briefly in several scenes as himself with his band, playing the accordion and sporting his normal mustache and curly hair. Tress MacNeille plays the role of Lucy, giving an impression of Lucille Ball's somewhat raspy voice and her usual shticks such as her unique way of crying.

Near the end of the video, a cheerleader can be seen dancing in the crowd. This is a direct reference to the music video for "Mickey".

The video (and song) ends with a segment of the I Love Lucy theme played on guitar rounding out with Ricky on accordion, followed by Ricky doing his trademark "Huah! Huah! Huah!" laugh. Dr. Demento makes a cameo appearance at the very end.

Chart positions

See also
List of singles by "Weird Al" Yankovic
List of songs by "Weird Al" Yankovic

References

External links
, official upload of the music video

1983 singles
1983 songs
I Love Lucy
Male–female vocal duets
Scotti Brothers Records singles
Songs about fictional male characters
Songs about television
Songs with lyrics by "Weird Al" Yankovic
Songs written by Mike Chapman
Songs written by Nicky Chinn
"Weird Al" Yankovic songs